Myrciaria alagoana is a species of plant in the family Myrtaceae and is endemic to the state of Alagoas in the east of Brazil. Myrciaria alagoana was first described in 2012 and is related to Myrciaria glomerata.

References

alagoana
Crops originating from the Americas
Tropical fruit
Flora of South America
Endemic flora of Brazil
Fruits originating in South America
Cauliflory
Fruit trees
Berries